Mariya Ilyichina Tolstova (15 May 1918  8 January 2004) was a flight commander in the 175th Guards Attack Aviation Regiment, and one of the few women to fly the Il-2.

Civilian life 
Tolstova was orphaned at a young age, resulting in her attending a boarding school for much of her youth. After completing school she worked at a railway station and later as a schoolteacher before eventually becoming a flight instructor at an aeroclub. After the war she worked for the civil air fleet, flying cargo in a Po-2 until retiring from aviation in 1959.

World War II 
Despite her experience as a flight instructor and aviation background, Tolstova volunteered to become a medical officer in order to be sent to the front. She briefly served as a field medic in the 5th Guards Airborne Regiment where she assisted hundreds of wounded soldiers, before her request for a transfer to aviation was granted. Initially she worked as a flight instructor in the 11th separate training regiment, training 36 pilots while doing so, before eventually being posted to the 175th Guards Attack Aviation Regiment in 1944. There, she flew 42 sorties on the Il-2 by the end of the war.

Awards
 Two Order of the Red Banner
 Order of the Patriotic War 2nd class
 Order of the Red Star
 Medal "For Courage"
 campaign and jubilee medals

See also 
 Anna Yegorova
 Tamara Konstantinova
 Lidiya Shulaykina
 Lyolya Boguzokova

References 

1918 births
2004 deaths
Soviet World War II pilots
Recipients of the Order of the Red Banner